Topaze may refer to:

Topaze (play), a 1928 French play written by Marcel Pagnol, which spawned a number of film adaptations:
Topaze (1933 American film), starring John Barrymore and Myrna Loy
Topaze (1933 French film), featuring Louis Jouvet and Simone Héliard 
Topaze (1936 film), directed by Pagnol
Topaze (1951 film), also directed by Pagnol
Topaze (1966 film), an Australian television play adaptation
Mr. Topaze, a 1961 film starring Peter Sellers
HMS Topaze, the name of four Royal Navy ships
French ship Topaze, the name of nine ships of the French Navy
Topaze (rocket), a French rocket

See also
Topaz (disambiguation)